Melampagos was a town of ancient Aeolis. It is evidenced by epigraphic evidence dated to the 5th century BCE on decrees establishing boundaries between Melampagos and Heraclea.
 
Its site is located near Gökkaya, Asiatic Turkey.

References

Populated places in ancient Aeolis
Former populated places in Turkey